The list of ship launches in 1980 includes a chronological list of all ships launched in 1980.


References

Sources

1980
Ship launches